Raymond John McLoughlin (21 August 1939 – 20 November 2021) was an Ireland rugby union international who was capped 40 times at prop, an Irish record at the time. He began at tight head, moving to the open side on his return to the Ireland team in 1971 after a five-year absence. McLoughlin captained his country on seven occasions. He was selected for two test series with the British Lions and played for invitational tourists the Barbarians. McLoughlin also had a long career at club and provincial level, representing Connacht.

Early life
He was born in Ahascragh, Ballinasloe, Co Galway, Ireland, and received his secondary school education at Garbally College and Blackrock College. He is one of five children of Tadhg Mac Lochlainn and Mel Kelly. He is a brother of Colm McLoughlin.

He studied at University College Dublin graduating with a Degree in Chemical Engineering and played for the university club UCD RFC.

Rugby career
He toured twice with the British Lions, in 1966 to Australia and New Zealand and again in 1971 to New Zealand. Both tours saw McLoughlin injured, though in the 1966 tour he managed to play in three Tests before being forced to retire. However, in 1971 he managed just five provincial games before he broke his thumb in a rough game against Canterbury.

McLoughlin's knowledge and scenario planning were highly valued by other good players. John Taylor, who toured with McLoughlin with the British Lions in 1971, described him as 'one of the best technicians the game has ever known'. Sports columnist Bill Bridge in 2008 named him as Ireland's best open-side prop of the previous 40 years.

Business career
Outside rugby, McLoughlin was a business man, and in 1973 he was the chief executive of James Crean, an industrial holdings company. As of 2006 he was the chairman of Oakhill printing group.

Death
He died on 20 November 2021, aged 82.

Notes

External links
 London Irish profile

1939 births
2021 deaths
Blackrock College RFC players
British & Irish Lions rugby union players from Ireland
Connacht Rugby players
Irish rugby union players
Ireland international rugby union players
London Irish players
People from Ballinasloe
Rugby union props
University College Dublin R.F.C. players
Barbarian F.C. players
Rugby union players from County Galway
People educated at Garbally College